The Theatre World Award is an American honor presented annually to actors and actresses in recognition of an outstanding New York City stage debut performance, either on Broadway or Off-Broadway. It was first awarded for the 1945–1946 theatre season.

History
In 1944, the Theatre World Awards were founded by Daniel Blum, Norman McDonald, and John Willis, recognizing "Promising Personalities", actors and actresses, in debut performances, in Broadway or Off-Broadway productions. In the first year Blum presented the awards in his apartment, at a cocktail party, to  Betty Comden, Judy Holliday and John Raitt, and the second year to Barbara Bel Geddes, Marlon Brando, and Burt Lancaster. At Blum's 1949 party, Carol Channing won. The Theatre World editorial staff administered the Awards, under the supervision of Daniel Blum.

In 1964, after Daniel Blum's death, John Willis supervised the Awards. In 1969, the award was renamed the Theatre World Award. The early awards were a framed certificate, then a plaque, later in 1973, the bronze Janus Award, sculpted by Harry Marinsky. In 1998, the Theatre World Awards were incorporated as a 501 (c) 3 nonprofit organization and are currently overseen by a board of directors independent of "Theatre World."

Winners are selected by a committee of New York-based critics. That committee includes (as of May 2015) Roma Torre (NY1), David Cote (Time Out7 New York, NY1), Joe Dziemianowicz (New York Daily News), Peter Filichia (The Newark Star-Ledger, Eme76ritus), Harry Haun (Playbill), Matthew Murray (TalkinBroadway.com), and Frank Scheck (New York Post).

.

Special honorary awards
The Dorothy Loudon Starbaby Award was instituted in 2009, named in honor of actress and singer Dorothy Loudon (1925–2003) and since 2010 has been awarded by the Dorothy Loudon Foundation in connection with these awards. The first Starbaby Award was presented to Susan Louise O'Connor (Blithe Spirit). Other recipients are Bobby Steggert (Ragtime and Yank!) (2009–10), Seth Numrich (War Horse) (2010–11), and Susan Pourfar (Tribes). In 2013, it was renamed Dorothy Loudon Award for Excellence in the Theater.

The first annual Lunt–Fontanne Award for Ensemble Excellence was presented at the 2010–11 Awards, to the cast of The Motherf**ker with the Hat – Bobby Cannavale, Chris Rock, Annabella Sciorra, Elizabeth Rodriguez and Yul Vázquez. The award is in honor of the late Alfred Lunt and Lynn Fontanne and is presented to an outstanding Broadway or Off-Broadway ensemble. In 2022 an award for "Outstanding Ensemble" was presented to the 21 cast members making their Broadway debuts in the revival of The Music Man.

John Willis Award
A new award, the John Willis Award, was first instituted for the 2012–13 season. It is given for "lifetime achievement in the theatre" to honor John Willis who created and maintained the Theatre World tradition for 66 years, encouraging new talent in an often challenging business." The first recipient was Alan Alda.

The award ceremony
The winners for the 2010–11 season were announced on May 10, 2011, with a ceremony held on June 7; the awards are traditionally presented by former award winners. The awards for the 2011–11 season were announced on May 8, 2012, and presented at a ceremony held on June 5, 2012, at the Belasco Theatre.

The awards for the 2012–13 season were announced on May 7, 2013, and the 69th Annual Theatre World Awards Ceremony was held on June 3 at the Music Box Theater. The awards for the 2013–14 season were announced on May 6, 2014, and the ceremony was held on June 2, 2014, at Circle in the Square. The awards for the 2014–15 season were announced on May 5, 2015; the ceremony will be held on June 1, 2015, at the Lyric Theatre.

Award winners
Past recipients, from 1944—1945 to 2015—2016

1995–1996
Jordan Baker - Suddenly Last Summer
Joohee Choi - The King and I
Karen Kay Cody - Master Class
Viola Davis - Seven Guitars
Kate Forbes - The School for Scandal
Michael McGrath - Swinging on a Star
Alfred Molina - Molly Sweeney
Timothy Olyphant - The Monogamist
Adam Pascal - Rent
Lou Diamond Phillips - The King and I
Daphne Rubin-Vega - Rent
Brett Tabisel - Big
Special Award - cast of An Ideal Husband

1996–1997
Terry Beaver - The Last Night of Ballyhoo
Helen Carey - London Assurance
Kristin Chenoweth - Steel Pier
Jason Danieley - Candide
Linda Eder - Jekyll & Hyde
Allison Janney - Present Laughter
Daniel McDonald - Steel Pier
Janet McTeer - A Doll's House
Mark Ruffalo - This Is Our Youth
Fiona Shaw - The Waste Land
Antony Sher - Stanley
Alan Tudyk - Bunny Bunny
Special Award - cast of Skylight

1997–1998
Source: Theatre World

Max Casella – The Lion King
Margaret Colin – Jackie
Ruaidhri Conroy – The Cripple of Inishmaan 
Alan Cumming – Cabaret 
Lea DeLaria – On the Town 
Edie Falco – Side Man
Enid Graham – Honour 
Anna Kendrick – High Society 
Ednita Nazario – The Capeman 
Douglas Sills – The Scarlet Pimpernel 
Steven Sutcliffe – Ragtime 
Sam Trammell – Ah, Wilderness!
Special Award - Eddie Izzard
Special Award - cast of The Beauty Queen of Leenane

1998–1999
Jillian Armenante -  The Cider House Rules
James Black - Not About Nightingales
Brendan Coyle - The Weir
Anna Friel - Closer
Rupert Graves - Closer
Lynda Gravatt - The Old Settler
Nicole Kidman - The Blue Room
Ciaran Hinds - Closer
Ute Lemper - Chicago
Clarke Peters - The Iceman Cometh
Toby Stephens - Ring Round the Moon
Sandra Oh - Stop Kiss
Special Award - Jerry Herman

1999–2000
Source: Theatre World
Craig Bierko –  The Music Man
Everett Bradley –  Swing!
Gabriel Byrne –  A Moon for the Misbegotten
Ann Hampton Callaway –  Swing!
Toni Collette –  The Wild Party
Henry Czerny –  Arms and the Man
Stephen Dillane –  The Real Thing
Jennifer Ehle –  The Real Thing
Philip Seymour Hoffman –  True West
Hayley Mills –  Suite in Two Keys
Cigdem Onat –  The Time of the Cuckoo
Claudia Shear –  Dirty Blonde
Special Award – Barry Humphries

2000–2001
Source: Theatre World
Juliette Binoche – Betrayal
Macaulay Culkin – Madame Melville
Janie Dee – Comic Potential
Raúl Esparza – The Rocky Horror Show
Kathleen Freeman –  The Full Monty
Deven May – Bat Boy
Reba McEntire – Annie Get Your Gun
Chris Noth – The Best Man
Joshua Park – The Adventures of Tom Sawyer
Rosie Perez – References to Salvador Dali Make Me Hot  
Joely Richardson – Madame Melville
John Ritter – The Dinner Party
 Special Award – Seán Campion 
 Special Award – Conleth Hill

2001–2002
Source: Theatre World
Justin Bohon –  Oklahoma!
Simon Callow –  The Mystery of Charles Dickens
Mos Def –  Topdog/Underdog
Emma Fielding –  Private Lives
Adam Godley –  Private Lives
Martin Jarvis –  By Jeeves
Spencer Kayden –  Urinetown
Gretchen Mol –  The Shape of Things
Anna Paquin –  The Glory of Living
Louise Pitre –  Mamma Mia!
David Warner –  Major Barbara
Rachel Weisz –  The Shape of Things

2002–2003
Source: Theatre World
Antonio Banderas –  Nine
Tammy Blanchard –  Gypsy
Thomas Jefferson Byrd –  Ma Rainey's Black Bottom
Jonathan Cake –  Medea
Victoria Hamilton –  A Day in the Death of Joe Egg
Clare Higgins –  Vincent in Brixton
Jackie Hoffman –  Hairspray
Mary Stuart Masterson –  Nine
John Selya –  Movin' Out
Jochum ten Haaf –  Vincent in Brixton
Daniel Sunjata –  Take Me Out
Marissa Jaret Winokur –  Hairspray
Special Award – Peter Filichia
Special Award – Ben Hodges

2003–2004
Source: Theatre World
Shannon Cochran –  Bug
Stephanie D'Abruzzo –  Avenue Q
Mitchel David Federan –  The Boy From Oz
Alexander Gemignani –  Assassins
Hugh Jackman – The Boy From Oz
Isabel Keating – The Boy From Oz
Sanaa Lathan –  A Raisin in the Sun
Jefferson Mays –  I Am My Own Wife
Euan Morton –  Taboo
Anika Noni Rose –  Caroline, or Change
John Tartaglia –  Avenue Q
Jennifer Westfeldt –  Wonderful Town
Special Award – Sarah Jones

2004–2005
Source: Theatre World
Christina Applegate –  Sweet Charity
Ashlie Atkinson –  Fat Pig
Hank Azaria –  Spamalot
Gordon Clapp –  Glengarry Glen Ross
Conor Donovan –  Privilege
Dan Fogler –  The 25th Annual Putnam County Spelling Bee
Heather Goldenhersh –  Doubt
Carla Gugino –  After the Fall
Jenn Harris –  Modern Orthodox
Cheyenne Jackson –  All Shook Up
Celia Keenan-Bolger – The 25th Annual Putnam County Spelling Bee
Tyler Maynard –  Altar Boyz

2005–2006
Source: Theatre World

Harry Connick, Jr. – The Pajama Game
Felicia P. Fields – The Color Purple
Maria Friedman – The Woman in White
Richard Griffiths – The History Boys
Mamie Gummer – Mr. Marmalade
Jayne Houdyshell – Well
Bob Martin – The Drowsy Chaperone
Ian McDiarmid – Faith Healer
Nellie McKay – The Threepenny Opera
David Wilmot – The Lieutenant of Inishmore
Elisabeth Withers-Mendes – The Color Purple
John Lloyd Young –  Jersey Boys

2006–2007
Fantasia Barrino – The Color Purple
Eve Best – A Moon for the Misbegotten
Mary Birdsong – Martin Short: Fame Becomes Me
Erin Davie – Grey Gardens
Xanthe Elbrick – Coram Boy
Johnny Galecki – The Little Dog Laughed
Jonathan Groff – Spring Awakening
Gavin Lee – Mary Poppins
Lin-Manuel Miranda – In the Heights
Bill Nighy – The Vertical Hour
Stark Sands – Journey's End
Nilaja Sun – No Child...
 Special award – Actors' Fund

2007–2008
De'Adre Aziza – Passing Strange
Cassie Beck – Drunken City
Daniel Breaker – Passing Strange
Ben Daniels – Les Liaisons Dangereuses
Deanna Dunagan – August: Osage County
Hoon Lee – Yellow Face
Alli Mauzey – Cry-Baby
Jenna Russell – Sunday in the Park with George
Mark Rylance – Boeing-Boeing
Loretta Ables Sayre – South Pacific
Jimmi Simpson – The Farnsworth Invention
Paulo Szot – South Pacific

2008–2009
Source:Playbill.com
David Alvarez/Trent Kowalik/Kiril Kulish – Billy Elliot, The Musical
Chad L. Coleman – Joe Turner's Come and Gone
Jennifer Grace – Our Town
Josh Grisetti – Enter Laughing, The Musical
Haydn Gwynne – Billy Elliot, The Musical
Colin Hanks – 33 Variations
Marin Ireland – reasons to be pretty
Susan Louise O'Connor – Blithe Spirit
Condola Rashad – Ruined
Geoffrey Rush – Exit the King
Josefina Scaglione – West Side Story
Wesley Taylor – Rock of Ages
Dorothy Loudon Starbaby Award: Susan Louise O'Connor – Blithe Spirit
Special Award to the entire cast of The Norman Conquests: Amelia Bullmore, Jessica Hynes, Stephen Mangan, Ben Miles, Paul Ritter and Amanda Root.

2009–2010
Source:Playbill.com
Nina Arianda – Venus in Fur
Chris Chalk – Fences
Bill Heck – The Orphans' Home Cycle
Jon Michael Hill – Superior Donuts
Scarlett Johansson – A View from the Bridge
Keira Keeley – The Glass Menagerie
Sahr Ngaujah – Fela!
Eddie Redmayne – Red
Andrea Riseborough – The Pride
Heidi Schreck – Circle Mirror Transformation
Stephanie Umoh – Ragtime
Michael Urie – The Temperamentals
Dorothy Loudon Starbaby Award: Bobby Steggert - Ragtime and Yank!

2010–2011
Source:Playbill.com
Ellen Barkin – The Normal Heart
Desmin Borges – The Elaborate Entrance of Chad Deity
Halley Feiffer – The House of Blue Leaves
Grace Gummer – Arcadia
Rose Hemingway – How to Succeed in Business Without Really Trying
John Larroquette – How to Succeed in Business Without Really Trying
Heather Lind – The Merchant of Venice
Patina Miller – Sister Act
Arian Moayed – Bengal Tiger at the Baghdad Zoo
Jim Parsons – The Normal Heart
Zachary Quinto – Angels in America: A Gay Fantasia on National Themes
Tony Sheldon – Priscilla, Queen of the Desert
Dorothy Loudon Starbaby Award: Seth Numrich - War Horse
Lunt-Fontanne Award for Ensemble Excellence – cast of The Motherfucker with the Hat

2011–2012
Source: Playbill.com
Tracie Bennett – End of the Rainbow
Phillip Boykin – The Gershwins' Porgy and Bess
Crystal A. Dickinson – Clybourne Park
Russell Harvard – Tribes
Jeremy Jordan – Bonnie & Clyde
Joaquina Kalukango – Hurt Village
Jennifer Lim – Chinglish
Jessie Mueller – On a Clear Day You Can See Forever
Hettienne Park – Seminar and The Intelligent Homosexual's Guide to Capitalism and Socialism with a Key to the Scriptures
Chris Perfetti – Sons of the Prophet
Finn Wittrock – Death of a Salesman
Josh Young – Jesus Christ Superstar
Dorothy Loudon Starbaby Award: Susan Pourfar - Tribes

2012–2013
Source:Playbill.com
Bertie Carvel – Matilda the Musical
Carrie Coon – Edward Albee's Who's Afraid of Virginia Woolf?
Brandon J. Dirden – The Piano Lesson
Shalita Grant – Vanya and Sonia and Masha and Spike 
Tom Hanks – Lucky Guy 
Valisia LeKae – Motown: The Musical
Rob McClure – Chaplin 
Ruthie Ann Miles – Here Lies Love 
Conrad Ricamora – Here Lies Love 
Keala Settle – Hands on a Hardbody
Yvonne Strahovski – Golden Boy
Tom Sturridge – Orphans
Dorothy Loudon Award for Excellence in the Theater: Johnny Orsini - The Nance
John Willis Award for Lifetime Achievement in the Theatre: Alan Alda

2013–2014
Source: Broadway.com
Paul Chahidi – Twelfth Night, or What You Will
Nick Cordero – Bullets Over Broadway
Bryan Cranston – All the Way
Mary Bridget Davies – A Night with Janis Joplin 
Sarah Greene – The Cripple of Inishmaan
Rebecca Hall – Machinal
Ramin Karimloo – Les Misérables
Zachary Levi – First Date
Chris O'Dowd – Of Mice and Men
Sophie Okonedo – A Raisin in the Sun
Emerson Steele – Violet
Lauren Worsham – A Gentleman's Guide to Love and Murder
Dorothy Loudon Award for Excellence in the Theater: Celia Keenan-Bolger - The Glass Menagerie
John Willis Award for Lifetime Achievement in the Theatre Winner: Christopher Plummer

2014–2015
Source: Playbill.com
 Geneva Carr – Hand to God
 Daveed Diggs – Hamilton
 Megan Fairchild – On the Town
 Robert Fairchild – An American in Paris
 Collin Kelly-Sordelet – The Last Ship
 Sydney Lucas – Fun Home
 Karen Pittman – Disgraced
 Benjamin Scheuer – The Lion
 Alex Sharp – The Curious Incident of the Dog in the Night-Time
 Emily Skeggs – Fun Home
 Micah Stock – It's Only a Play
 Ruth Wilson – Constellations
 Dorothy Loudon Award for Excellence in the Theater: Leanne Cope – An American In Paris
 John Willis Award for Lifetime Achievement in the Theatre: Chita Rivera

2015–2016
Source: Playbill.com
 Danielle Brooks – The Color Purple
 Carmen Cusack – Bright Star
 Khris Davis – The Royale
 Daniel Durant – Spring Awakening
 Cynthia Erivo – The Color Purple
 John Krasinski – Dry Powder
 Sarah Charles Lewis – Tuck Everlasting
 Austin P. McKenzie – Spring Awakening
 Lupita Nyong'o – Eclipsed
 Mark Strong – A View From The Bridge
 Ana Villafañe – On Your Feet!
 Ben Whishaw – The Crucible
 Dorothy Loudon Award for Excellence in the Theater: Nicholas Barasch – She Loves Me
 John Willis Award for Lifetime Achievement in the Theatre: Bernadette Peters

2016–2017
Source: BroadwayWorld.com
Carlo Albán - Sweat
Christy Altomare - Anastasia
Denée Benton - Natasha, Pierre & The Great Comet of 1812
Jon Jon Briones - Miss Saigon
Barrett Doss - Groundhog Day
Amber Gray - Natasha, Pierre & The Great Comet of 1812
Josh Groban - Natasha, Pierre & The Great Comet of 1812
Lucas Hedges - Yen
Raymond Lee - Vietgone
Eva Noblezada - Miss Saigon
Jeremy Secomb - Sweeney Todd
Cobie Smulders - Present Laughter
Dorothy Loudon Award for Excellence in the Theater: Katrina Lenk, Indecent and The Band's Visit
John Willis Award for Lifetime Achievement in the Theatre: Glenn Close
Special Theatre World Award: Dave Malloy for his Broadway debut in Natasha, Pierre & the Great Comet of 1812 as an actor, composer, writer, lyricist, and orchestrator.

2017–2018
Anthony Boyle - Harry Potter and the Cursed Child
Jamie Brewer - Amy and the Orphans
Noma Dumezweni - Harry Potter and the Cursed Child
Johnny Flynn - Hangmen
Denise Gough - Angels in America
Harry Hadden-Paton - My Fair Lady
Hailey Kilgore - Once on This Island
James McArdle - Angels in America
Lauren Ridloff - Children of a Lesser God
Ethan Slater - SpongeBob SquarePants
Charlie Stemp - Hello, Dolly!
Katy Sullivan - Cost of Living
Dorothy Loudon Award for Excellence in the Theater: Ben Edelman, Admissions
John Willis Award for Lifetime Achievement in the Theatre: Victor Garber

2018–2019
Gbenga Akinnagbe - To Kill a Mockingbird
Tom Glynn-Carney - The Ferryman
Sophia Anne Caruso - Beetlejuice
Paddy Considine - The Ferryman
James Davis - Oklahoma!
Micaela Diamond - The Cher Show
Bonnie Milligan - Head Over Heels
Simone Missick - Paradise Blue
Jeremy Pope - Choir Boy
Colton Ryan - Girl from the North Country
Stephanie Styles - Kiss Me, Kate
Phoebe Waller-Bridge - Fleabag
John Willis Award for Lifetime Achievement in the Theatre: Nathan Lane

2021-2022
Patrick J Adams - Take Me Out
Yair Ben-Dor - Prayer for the French Republic
Kearstin Piper-Brown - Intimate Apparel
Sharon D Clarke - Caroline, or Change
Enrico Colantoni - Birthday Candles
Justin Cooley - Kimberly Akimbo
Crystal Flynn - Birthday Candles
Gaby French - Hangmen
Myles Frost - MJ the Musical
Jaquel Spivey - A Strange Loop
Shannon Tyo - The Chinese Lady
Kara Young - Clyde's

See also
Tony Awards
Drama Desk Awards
Obie Awards
Theatre World

References

External links
Official website

American theater awards
Awards established in 1946
1946 establishments in New York City